Dávid Stoiacovici (born 5 July 1999) is a Hungarian football player who plays for Pénzügyőr.

Career

Budapest Honvéd
On 18 November 2017, Stoiacovici played his first match for Budapest Honvéd in a 1-2 loss against Újpest in the Hungarian League.

Club statistics

Updated to games played as of 9 August 2020.

References

External links
 
 

1999 births
Footballers from Budapest
Living people
Hungarian footballers
Hungary youth international footballers
Association football midfielders
Budapest Honvéd FC players
Budapest Honvéd FC II players
Tiszakécske FC footballers
FC Ajka players
Pénzügyőr SE footballers
Nemzeti Bajnokság I players
Nemzeti Bajnokság II players
Nemzeti Bajnokság III players